The Podunavlje District is one of nine administrative districts of Southern and Eastern Serbia. It expands across the central parts of Serbia. According to the 2011 census results, it has a population of 199,395 inhabitants, and the administrative center is the city of Smederevo.

Cities and municipalities
It encompasses the municipalities of:
 Smederevo
 Smederevska Palanka
 Velika Plana

Demographics

According to the last official census done in 2011, the Podunavlje District has 199,395 inhabitants. 52.09% of the population lives in the urban areas.

Ethnic groups
Ethnic composition of the district:

History and culture
Smederevo was the capital of the Serb State in the fourteenth century - there stood the royal palace at the time of the then Serbian ruler Đurađ Branković. Today, in the remnants of the Smederevo fortress, finished in 1430, traces of the former palace, chapel, and the house of the royal family can be discerned. At the old city cemetery stands a church from the fourteenth century, assumed to have been the family vault of the Serb ruler Đurađ Branković, which gave rise to numerous legends.

This area is also well known as the place of the Karađorđe's assassination after The First Serbian Uprising around the Pokajnica monastery near Velika Plana.

Settlements

This is a list of the settlements in the Podunavlje District:

 Azanja
 Badljevica
 Baničina
 Bačinac
 Bašin
 Binovac
 Cerovac
 Dobri Do
 Drugovac
 Glibovac
 Golobok
 Grčac
 Kolari
 Krnjevo
 Kulič
 Kusadak
 Landol
 Lipe
 Lozovik
 Lugavčina
 Mala Krsna
 Mala Plana
 Malo Orašje
 Markovac
 Mihajlovac
 Miloševac
 Mramorac
 Novo Selo
 Orešac
 Osipaonica
 Petrijevo
 Pridvorice
 Radinac
 Rakinac
 Ralja
 Ratari
 Saraorci
 Selevac
 Seone
 Skobalj
 Smederevo
 Smederevska Palanka
 Staro selo
 Stojačak
 Suvodol
 Udovice
 Veliko Orašje
 Velika Plana
 Vlaški Do
 Vodanj
 Vodice
 Vranovo
 Vrbovac
 Vučak
 Šalinac

See also
 Administrative divisions of Serbia
 Districts of Serbia
 Podunavlje

References

Note: All official material made by Government of Serbia is public by law. Information was taken from official website.

External links

 

 
Districts of Southern and Eastern Serbia
Wine regions of Serbia